Robby Robinson is a music director, keyboardist, composer, arranger, and producer living in the Los Angeles area. He is best known as the music director and keyboardist for Frankie Valli since 1978, and in this capacity has conducted orchestras such as the London Symphony Orchestra at the Royal Albert Hall, the Houston Symphony, the Pacific Symphony, and the National Symphony Orchestra. Robinson is a Hammond USA "family artist".

Early life and education 
Robinson is originally from Litchfield, Illinois. He studied piano from age 7, saxophone from age 8, and started playing in rock bands at age 14. He majored in music at Southern Illinois University of Edwardsville. From high school through college, Robinson played in a variety of bands in the Southern Illinois-St. Louis area, after college he toured the US with Phil Driscoll and "Patch & Didi" (with his brother Rex Robinson, Lynn Hamman, and Didi Carr). The Robinson brothers moved to Los Angeles in 1976.

Career 
From 1976 to 1978 Robinson played, arranged, and produced with a broad range of musicians such as Liza Minnelli,  Tom Jones,Alphonse Mouzon, Buddy Greco, and Les DeMerle. In 1978, at the recommendation of long-time friend Richie Gajate Garcia, Robinson joined Frankie Valli and The Four Seasons, he has been the group's music director, conductor and keyboardist for over 40 years. In some circles, Robinson is known as the Fifth Season.

Robinson founded the annual Christmas concert, Jam for Jesus, in 1991, which is hosted at Bethlehem SCV in Canyon Country, Santa Clarita, California.

In 2017, and in 2019, the Robinson brothers returned to Litchfield to perform in benefit concerts for St. Francis Hospital, the two shows raised a quarter of a million dollars for the small-town hospital.

Personal life
Robinson lives in California.

References

External links 
 
 

American male organists
American record producers
Musicians from Illinois
People from Litchfield, Illinois
Southern Illinois University Edwardsville alumni
Music directors
21st-century American composers
20th-century American composers
American music arrangers
The Four Seasons (band) members
Year of birth missing (living people)
Living people